The following is a list of churches in Copeland.

The parishes of Parton, Lowca and Lowside Quarter do not appear to have any active churches.

The borough has an estimated 71 churches for 70,603 inhabitants, a ratio of one church to every 994 people.

Map of medieval parish churches
For the purposes of this map medieval is taken to be pre-1485. It is of note that Cumbria, unlike most parts of England, saw a sustained programme of church building during the 16th and 17th centuries as the more remote parts of the district were settled.

List

References

 
Churches
Copeland
Churches